The Shire of East Loddon was a local government area about  northwest of Bendigo, in northwestern Victoria, Australia.

History

East Loddon was first incorporated as a road district on 28 December 1864, and became a shire on 28 July 1871.

On 20 January 1995, the Shire of East Loddon was abolished, and along with the Shires of Gordon and Korong, the Loddon River district of the former Rural City of Marong, and a number of surrounding districts, was merged into the newly created Shire of Loddon.

Wards

The Shire of East Loddon was divided into three ridings on 14 May 1913, each of which elected three councillors:
 North Riding
 South Riding
 East Riding

Towns and localities
 Bears Lagoon
 Calivil
 Dingee
 Jarklin
 Kamarooka
 Mitiamo
 Pompapiel
 Prairie
 Serpentine*
 Tandarra
 Yallook

* Council seat.

Population

* Estimate in the 1958 Victorian Year Book.

References

External links
 Victorian Places - East Loddon Shire

East Loddon